Inglorious Bastards may refer to:

Films
 The Inglorious Bastards (Quel maledetto treno blindato), a 1978 Italian action/war film directed by Enzo G. Castellari
 Inglourious Basterds, a 2009 war film written and directed by Quentin Tarantino
The Real Inglorious Bastards, a 2012 short film documentary about the OSS officers who volunteered to operate behind enemy lines during Operation Greenup

See also
 "Inglorious", the 15th track from Tyler, The Creator's 2009 album Bastard